Guarne is a town and municipality in the Colombian department of Antioquia. Part of the subregion of Eastern Antioquia. It is situated 24 km east of Medellín.

History
The first settlers of Guarne were Tahamíes Indians who came from the Nare River. In 1541, Alvaro Mendoza entered the Guarne area, but finding no gold, returned to the Aburrá Valley. In 1640, searching for gold, Captain Fernando del Toro Zapata and Diego Beltran del Castillo arrived at Guarne. The first non-Amerindian settlers of the area of Guarne were slaves. In 1757, Guarne became part of Rionegro, and in 1814, Juan del Corral created the Guarne Township.

References

Municipalities of Antioquia Department
Populated places established in 1814